Mary Towne Eastey (also spelled Esty, Easty, Estey, Eastick, Eastie, or Estye) (bap. August 24, 1634 – September 22, 1692) was a defendant in the Salem witch trials in colonial Massachusetts. She was executed by hanging in Salem in 1692.

Early life
Mary Eastey was born Mary Towne to William Towne and Joanna Towne (née Blessing) in Great Yarmouth, Norfolk, England. She was one of eight children, among them her sisters and fellow Salem defendants Rebecca Nurse and Sarah Cloyce. Mary Towne and her family moved to America around 1640. She married Isaac Estey, a farmer and barrel-maker, in 1655 in Topsfield, Massachusetts Bay Colony. Isaac was born in England on November 27, 1627; the couple had eleven children: Joseph (1657–1739), Sarah (1660–1749), John, Isaac (1662–1714), Hannah, Benjamin, Samuel, Jacob, Joshua, Jeffrey, and Isaac.

Accusation and trial

Like her sister Rebecca Nurse, Eastey was a pious and respected citizen of Salem, and her accusation came as a surprise. During the examination on April 22, 1692, when Eastey clasped her hands together, Mercy Lewis, one of the afflicted, imitated the gesture and claimed to be unable to release her hands until Eastey released her own. Again, when Eastey inclined her head, the afflicted girls accused her of trying to break their necks. Mercy claimed that Eastey's spectre had climbed into her bed and laid her hand upon her breasts. In the face of such public hysteria, Mary Eastey defended herself with remarkable eloquence: when she was  asked by the  magistrates John Hathorne and Jonathan Corwin how far she had complied with Satan, she replied, "Sir, I never complyed with Satan  but prayed against him all my dayes, I have no complyance with Satan, in this ... I will say it,  if it is my last time,  I am clear of this sin." Hathorne, showing a momentary doubt about  her guilt, went so far as to ask the girls if they were quite sure that  Mary Eastey was the woman who afflicted them.

For reasons unknown, Eastey was released from prison on May 18 after two months. However, on May 20, Mercy Lewis claimed that Eastey's spectre was afflicting her, a claim which other girls supported. A second warrant was issued that night for Eastey's arrest. She was taken from her bed and returned to the prison; Lewis ceased her fits after Eastey was chained. Eastey was tried and condemned to death on September 9.

Robert Calef, in More Wonders of the Invisible World, described Eastey's parting words to her family "as serious, religious, distinct, and affectionate as could be expressed, drawing tears from the eyes of almost all present". She was hanged on September 22, along with Martha Corey, Ann Pudeator, Alice Parker, Mary Parker, Wilmot Redd, Margaret Scott, and Samuel Wardwell: Cotton Mather, to his later embarrassment, denounced them as "eight firebrands of Hell".  On the gallows she prayed for an end to the witch hunt. Of her two sisters, likewise charged with witchcraft, Rebecca Nurse was hanged on July 19, 1692, but Sarah Cloyce was released in January 1693.

Calef also published Mary Eastey's last petition to the Court, of which it has been said that no more moving document has ever been addressed to any judge. Mary pleaded not for her own life but for those of the others falsely accused: "I petition your honours not for my own life for I know I must die and my appointed time is set but the Lord he knows it is that no more innocent blood be shed.....the Lord above that is the searcher of all hearts knows that as I shall answer at the Tribunal seat I never knew the least thing of witchcraft".

In November, after Eastey had been put to death, Mary Herrick gave testimony about Eastey. Herrick testified that she was visited by Eastey's ghost, who told her she had been put to death wrongfully and was innocent of witchcraft, and that she had come to vindicate her cause. Eastey's family was compensated with 20 pounds from the government in 1711 for her wrongful execution.

In popular culture

 Mary Eastey was referred to as a witch in the 2013 horror movie The Conjuring, as was her supposed relative, Bathsheba, who possessed those who lived on her land.
 Mary Eastey was mentioned to be a witch in Season 1 Episode 2 of the TV series Charmed.
 In the  1985 PBS drama Three Sovereigns for Sarah she was played by Kim Hunter.
 In The Crucible, by Arthur Miller, Mary Eastey does not appear on stage, but is named in Act IV, like her sister Rebecca Nurse, as one of those alleged witches whose execution, due to their blameless lives, may cause a backlash against the witchcraft trials. The hero, John Proctor, is pressed hard to name her as a witch, but refuses to do so.
 The Primate Fiasco released the song "Mary Towne Estey 1692" in 2017. The lead singer and songwriter of The Primate Fiasco, Dave Russo, claims descent from Mary Towne Estey.

References

Sources
 Upham, Charles (1980). Salem Witchcraft. New York: Frederick Ungar Publishing Co., 2 vv., v. 2 pp. 60, 128, 137, 200–205, 324–327, 480.

External links
 Famous American Trials - Mary Easty
 Examination of Mary Easty

1634 births
1692 deaths
People executed by the Massachusetts Bay Colony
17th-century executions of American people
Executed English women
Kingdom of England emigrants to Massachusetts Bay Colony
People of the Salem witch trials
American people executed for witchcraft
People executed by the Province of Massachusetts Bay
People from Great Yarmouth
Executed people from Norfolk
People executed by the Thirteen Colonies by hanging
People executed by Massachusetts by hanging